Piero Pasinati, born Pietro Pasinati (21 July 1910 – 15 November 2000) was an Italian football player and manager, who played as a striker.

Club career
Pasinati was born in Trieste. During his club career, he played for Italian teams Triestina (1927–1939 and 1941–1946), A.C. Milan (1939–40), Novara Calcio (1940–41), Cremonese in Serie B (1946–48), and San Giovanni Trieste, in the third division (1948–49). With Triestina he played 256 Serie A matches.

International career
With Italy, Pasinati obtained 10 international caps, scoring 1 goal, which came in his only appearance in the team's victorious 1938 FIFA World Cup campaign, which came in the nation's first round match against Norway.

Managerial career
Following his retirement, Pasinati coached Ponziana, Sambenedettese, Salernitana, Triestina, Catanzaro and Empoli.

Managerial statistics

Honours

International 
Italy
FIFA World Cup: 1938

References

1910 births
2000 deaths
Footballers from Trieste
Italian footballers
Italy international footballers
Serie A players
Serie B players
U.S. Triestina Calcio 1918 players
A.C. Milan players
Novara F.C. players
U.S. Cremonese players
1938 FIFA World Cup players
FIFA World Cup-winning players
Italian football managers
A.S. Sambenedettese managers
U.S. Salernitana 1919 managers
U.S. Triestina Calcio 1918 managers
U.S. Catanzaro 1929 managers
Association football forwards